El Espanto Surge de la Tumba is the third album by Dorso. In this album the band wanted to try a more brutal and extreme sound.

Track list
Deadly Pajarraco
Ultraputrefactus Criatura
 El Espanto Surge de la Tumba
 Silvestre Holocaust
Horrible Sacrifice
Jazz–pop clásico
Extraterrestre Gore Caníbal Invasión
 Vampire of the Night
La Mansión del Dr. Mortis
Zombies from Mapocho
Terror Carnaza

Personnel
 Rodrigo Cuadra – vocals, bass and keyboard
 Alvaro Soms – lead guitar
 Marcelo Naves – drums
 Gamal Eltit – rhythm guitar

1993 albums
Dorso albums